{{Speciesbox
| name = Sharpear enope squid
| image = Ancistrocheirus lesueurii.jpg 
| status = LC
| status_system = IUCN3.1
| status_ref = 
| grandparent_authority = Pfeffer, 1912
| genus = Ancistrocheirus
| parent_authority = Gray, 1849
| species = lesueurii
| authority = (D'Orbigny, 1842)
| synonyms = *Abralia megalops Verrill, 1882Ancistroteuthis lesueurii (d'Orbigny, 1842)Enoploteuthis lesueurii d'Orbigny, 1842Enoploteuthis pallida Pfeffer, 1884Enoploteuthis polyonyx Troschel, 1857Loligo alessandrinii Vérany, 1847Onychia caribaea Steenstrup, 1880Onychoteuthis lesueurii Férussac, 1835Thelidioteuthis alessandrinii (Vérany, 1847)
| synonyms_ref = 
}}Ancistrocheirus lesueurii, the sharpear enope squid, is the only species in the genus Ancistrocheirus'' and family Ancistrocheiridae.  With a mantle length of 25 cm, this moderately sized squid may be found throughout the tropical and subtropical oceans.  They tend to be found at mesopelagic depths (200–1000 m down).

Although only one species is recognized, some have suggested more than one species may exist due to differences in the paralarval morphology.  Paralarva is the first free-living stage for cephalopods.

Characteristics
The buccal crown of the sharpear enope squid is heavily pigmented.  The squid has no vesicles. There are hooks on all its arms.  The suckers are absent from its manus and the squid's dactylus is reduced.

Photophores
Photophores occur throughout its body.  Large photophores are present on its head, funnel, base of arms, and tentacular stalk.  Other photophores are present on the ventral surface of its mantle (usually 22), with numerous very small photophores on its head, funnel, base of arms II and tentacular stalk.  Mature males have large photophores on tips of arms IV opposite the mouth.  Mature females have photophores on tips of their dorsal six arms. The number of large photopores on the squid's mantle increases as it matures.

Ecology
They are eaten by the sperm whale in Southeast Asia and Galapagos waters

References

Tree of Life web project: Ancistrocheirus lesueurii
ITIS entry

Squid
Cephalopod genera
Monotypic mollusc genera
Bioluminescent molluscs
Taxa named by John Edward Gray
Taxobox binomials not recognized by IUCN